European bat 1 lyssavirus (EBLV-1) is one of three rabies virus-like agents of the genus Lyssavirus found in serotine bats (Eptesicus serotinus) in Spain. Strains of EBLV-1 have been identified as EBLV-1a and EBLV-1b. EBLV-1a was isolated from bats found in the Netherlands and Russia, while EBLV-1b was found in bats in France, the Netherlands and Iberia. E. isabellinus bats are the EBLV-1b reservoir in the Iberian Peninsula. Between 1977 and 2010, 959 bat rabies cases of EBLV-1 were reported to the World Health Organization (WHO) Rabies Bulletin.

Virology

Genome
EBLV-1 is a negative-sense single-stranded RNA virus.

See also 
Australian bat lyssavirus

References

External links 
Viral Zone
Phylogeny
Public Health England
WHO Rabies Bulletin

Lyssaviruses